Linux is an open-source kernel and usually comes bundled with free and open-source software; however, proprietary software for Linux (software that isn't free and open-source) does exist and is available to end-users.

Networking

Web browsers

FTP clients

Firewall (packet filtering)
 Opendium Web Gateway – part of a content control system targeted at schools
 Opendium UTM – part of a content control system targeted at schools
 SmoothWall Corporate – a closed fork of SmoothWall, targeted at enterprise and corporate users

Visual traceroute 
 VisualRoute

P2P file sharing 
 Loophole (WinMX protocol) – WinMX servers down since 09.2005
 MetaMachine eDonkey2000 – latest release from 25.07.2005 (discontinued)
 μTorrent Server

"Hotline" P2P protocol clients/servers
 GHX

Multifunction sound modem programs 
 PrimaFax

Fax software 
 Esker Fax
 Fax2Send
 FAXCOM
 Ictfax
 MessagePlus/Open
 U-Fax

Network maintenance 
 HP Openview agents

Routing 
 GateD

Distributed computing
 Portable Batch System PBS Gridworks

Instant messaging
 Discord
 Skype
 ICQ
 Viber
 Trillian

P2P file synchronisation
 BitTorrent Sync

VoIP software
 Skype
 Zoom client for Linux
alfaview

Desktop/system software

Work with files

Console archivers 
 RAR
 B1 Free Archiver

Desktop search
 Google Desktop (discontinued) 1.0, released June 27, 2007

File splitters
 HJSplit for Linux – freeware, also available on other platforms

PDF viewers

PDF authoring 
 Adobe Acrobat Distiller (discontinued)

Cryptography
 Pretty Good Privacy

Scanner utilities 
 VueScan
 Xvscan last updated in 2000

Antivirus 

 Avast! Antivirus
 AVG Anti-Virus
 Bitdefender GravityZone
 Comodo Group Anti-Virus for Linux
 Dr. Web
 F-Prot (not to be confused with F-Secure)
 Kaspersky Anti-Virus
 ESET NOD32
 RAV Antivirus (discontinued)
 Sophos Antivirus for Linux
 Trend Micro ServerProtect for Linux
 Vexira for Linux Fileserver
 Vexira for Linux Samba Server

Bootloader / Boot manager

Hard disk partitioning 
 Acronis PartitionExpert
 Paragon Partition Manager

Backup software

PIM / DB / hierarchical notebook with tree view
 TreePad Lite

File hosting service clients
 Dropbox
 Mega

Drivers

Printer drivers 
 Brother Industries
 Hewlett-Packard (HP) 
 Lexmark International
 TurboPrint

Multimedia

Audio/video

Digital audio workstations 
 Bitwig Studio
 Mixbus
 ocenaudio
 REAPER (experimentally)
 Renoise
 Tracktion

MP3 encoding
 L3enc (discontinued)

Score writers
 Guitar Pro

Multimedia players 
 Fluendo DVD Player
 LinDVD
 Moovida Pro
 Musictube
 PowerDVD for Linux (discontinued)
 JRiver Media Center
 RealPlayer (discontinued)

Music 
 Dataplore
 Dataplore CMS
 energyXT
 Guitar Pro
 Loomer Aspect
 Loomer Manifold
 Loomer Resound
 Loomer Sequent
 Loomer Shift v2
 Loomer String
 MuSing
 Netease Cloud Music
 Pianoteq
 RecordPad
 Spotify
 Transcribe!

Graphics

Graphics viewers/editors

Professional graphics editors and photography 
 AfterShot Pro
 Corel Photo-Paint 9 (discontinued)
 PaintSupreme
 Pixel32
 Pixeluvo

Digital imaging 
 Bibble
 FX Photo Effects

2D bitmap animation and paint 
 Harmony
 TVPaint

Vector graphics editors 
 Corel Draw 9 (discontinued)
 Edraw Max 9.4
 Xara Xtreme (discontinued)

Flash players 
 Adobe Flash Player – freeware

3D graphics
 AC3D
 Chrono::R3D
 Houdini
 MASSIVE
 Maya
 Softimage
 MODO
 Substance Designer by Adobe
 Substance Painter by Adobe
 Mari by The Foundry Visionmongers
 VariCAD

Video, etc.

Simple/professional video production environments 
 Autodesk/Discreet Flint/Flame/Inferno
 Autodesk/Discreet Smoke
 IFX Piranha
 ifxAnt
 Lightworks
 DaVinci Resolve
 iMira Editing (discontinued)
 MainActor (discontinued)

Creation of 2D and 3D effects 
 Fusion – Linux version is based upon the Windows version using wine.
 Nuke
 Shake (discontinued)

Miscellaneous 
 Google Earth
 TrueCrypt – the source code is available, but the license is considered "unclear" and therefore not considered "free" by some of the major Linux distributions, and even considered with "potential to be actively dangerous" by Fedora

Office/business

Office suites 
 ApplixWare Office (see Applixware Words)
 EIOffice
 HancomOffice
 SoftMaker Office
 ThinkFree Office
 WPS Office (previously known as Kingsoft Office)
 Yozo Office

Word processors
 TextMaker
 UltraCompare
 UltraEdit
 WPS Writer

Spreadsheets 
 DataScene
 WPS Spreadsheet

Presentations 
 PageStream 
 WPS Presentation

Local databases 
 InterBase 7
 Rekall
 StarOffice Adabas D (discontinued)

Desktop publishing 
 VivaDesigner

E-commerce and web business 
 IBM WebSphere Application Server
 Oracle Application Server (discontinued)
 WebLogic

Personal finance managers 
 Moneydance

Financial accounting 
 Hansa Business Solutions – global
 Kalculate – India and Asia
 LeftHand Mała Firma
 LeftHand Mała Ksiegowość
 LeftHand Pełna Księgowość
 LeftHand Sprzedaż i Magazyn
 LeftHand Stowarzyszenia i Fundacje
 Locbook

Enterprise automation (Russian)
 Keeper
 Oblik

Collaboration software 
 Kerika
 Microsoft Teams
 TeamViewer
 Slack

Project management 
 Cando Projects Server

Mind mapping/diagramming software
 Xmind (Pro Edition)
 yEd
 WireframeSketcher
 EdrawMax

Communications software 
 EasyIVR Call processing (IVR, CTI, ACD) – for Linux

Games

Game distribution platforms
 Steam

Action-adventure

Adventure

Business simulation

Card

City simulation

First-person shooter
{| class="wikitable sortable" style="margin:auto; margin:auto;"
!style="text-align:center;"|Game
!style="text-align:center;"|Publisher
!style="text-align:center;"|Support status
!style="text-align:center;"|Native binary
!style="text-align:center;"|Source code
!style="text-align:center;"|Pricing
|-
|Aliens versus Predator
|
|
|
|
|
|-
|America's Army
|
|
|
|
|
|-
|Counter-Strike: Global Offensive
|Valve
|Active
|
|
|
|-
|Dark Horizons Lore: Invasion
|
|
|
|
|
|-
|Descent³
|
|
|
|
|
|-
|Doom 3
|
|
|
|
|
|-
|Duke Nukem 3D
|
|
|
|
|
|-
|Enemy Territory: Quake Wars
|
|
|
|
|
|-
|Grappling Hook
|
|
|
|
|
|-
|Medal of Honor: Allied Assault
|
|Unfinished beta
|
|
|
|-
|Postal²
|
|
|
|
|
|-
|Team Fortress 2|Valve
|Active
|
|
|
|-
|Unreal Tournament
|GT Interactive
|
|
|
|
|-
|Unreal Tournament 2003
|Infogrames
|
|
|
|
|-
|Unreal Tournament 2004
|Atari
|
|
|
|
|-
|}

Graphic adventure

MMORPG

Platformer

Puzzle

Racing

Real-time tactics

Role-playing game (RPG)

Shoot 'em up

Stealth

Strategy

Survival horror

Sports simulator

Third-person shooter

Visual novel

 Dwarf Fortress Enter the Gungeon Factorio FizzBall (discontinued)
 Garry's Mod Heroes of Newerth MindRover Minecraft Prey Quake (all versions)
 Railroad Tycoon II Raptor: Call of the Shadows (discontinued)
 Regnum Online Return to Castle Wolfenstein RimWorld Rise of the Triad Robin Hood: The Legend of Sherwood Rune Savage 2 Savage: The Battle for Newerth Serious Sam (all versions unfinished ports; beta)
 Shadowgrounds Survivor Shadowgrounds Shogo: Mobile Armor Division Sid Meier's Alpha Centauri SimCity 3000 SiN Sleepless Night Soldier of Fortune Space Combat Spheres of Chaos Stardew Valley Summer Session Tabletop Simulator Terminus Terraria The Labyrinth of Time Theocracy This Is Where I Want To Die Tibia Toribash Total War: Three Kingdoms Total War: Warhammer II Tribal Trouble Tribes II Ultima Online (discontinued)
 Uplink Vendetta Online World of Goo X-Plane X2: The Threat Yohoho! Puzzle Pirates Programming and development 

C++ IDEs
 Code Crusader
 CodeWarrior
 KDE Studio Gold
 Kylix (discontinued)
 SlickEdit
 TimeStorm
 UEStudio
 Understand for C++
 JetBrains CLion

PHP IDE
 Zend Studio
 JetBrains PHPStorm

 CASE 

 CASE-facility for UML 
 Together ControlCenter

 Top-level CASE system 
 Rational Rose

Compilers
 Intel C++ Compiler
 Intel Fortran Compiler
 Lahey/Fujitsu Fortran Compiler
 XL C/C++ Compiler, IBM
 XL Fortran Compiler, IBM

Revision control

 HTML/DHTML editors 
 Microsoft Visual Studio Code
 JetBrains PyCharm

 InterBase/Firebird IDE 
 IBAdmin

Java IDE
 JetBrains IntelliJ IDEA
 Sun ONE Studio

 Memory leak tracing 
 Insure

 Object Pascal IDE 
 Kylix

Perl/Python/Tcl IDE
 ActiveState Komodo
 JetBrains PyCharm
 Sublime Text

 Prolog 
 SICStus Prolog

WYSIWYG HTML editors
 IBM WebSphere Homepage Builder
 IndexFinger
 BlueGriffon

 Servers 

 SSH Client/Server 
 SecureCRT/VShell Server
 Termius
 Tectia SSH

 Web Hosting Control Panel 
cPanel
DirectAdmin
Plesk

WWW
 Abyss Web Server – original open source version is being developed as part of xmlrpc-c project
 Adobe JRun
 CGIProxy – source available for non-commercial use
 LiteSpeed Web Server
 Zeus Web Server (discontinued)

 DB engines 
 IBM Db2
 Informix
 Microsoft SQL Server
 Oracle
 Sybase Adaptive Server Enterprise

 E-mail / personal information manager / groupware servers 
 Bynari
 CommuniGate Pro
 Lotus Domino
 NetMail
 Novell GroupWise
 Open-Xchange
 Scalix (based on HP OpenMail)
 SCOoffice Mail Server
 Teamware Office
 Zarafa
 Hiri
 InScribe

 Product data/product lifecycle management (PDM/PLM) 
 Siemens Teamcenter

 Proxy 
 Opendium Web Gateway content control system targeted at schools
 Opendium UTM content control system targeted at schools

 Cluster filesystems 
 Matrix Server

 Managed file transfer 
 Serv-U File Server – managed file transfer server, supporting FTP, FTPS, SFTP, HTTP, and HTTPS file transfer methods

 Streaming media servers 
 Emby
 Plex

Miscellaneous applications

 Mathematics 
 Magma
 Maple
 Mathematica
 MATLAB
  Xoctave Scientific Development Environment: Octave GUI

Statistical packages
 R/Rstudio
 PSPP
 Stata
 TSP

3D modelling
 CityEngine 
 PhotoScan by Agisoft
 Pro/ENGINEER Linux (discontinued)
 Parasolid
 Realsoft 3D 
 Siemens NX

CAD/CAM/CAE
 Adina – by ADINA R&D
 ARCAD 3D
 ARES Commander
 BricsCAD – IntelliCAD-based commercial CAD solution
 CAM Expert Professional
 CATIA – by Dassault Systèmes
 CYCAS by Verlag Frese
 DraftSight – by Dassault Systèmes
 EAGLE
 MEDUSA
 Siemens NX
 QCAD – by RibbonSoft, professional is built on the QCAD opensource package
 RI-CAD
 Simcenter STAR-CCM+ by Siemens. 
 Synergy by Weber Systems
 VariCAD – by VariCAD s.r.o.

 Diagram and chart designing 
 DataScene
 Poseidon for UML
 Visual Paradigm

 Dictionaries 
 Lunestar – an English-Turkish dictionary, freeware

 HDD testing/benchmarking 
 SPEC SFS

 Game makers 
 Maker3D – a 3D RPG creation software
 Tululoo Game Maker – a complex game creation system environment

 Real property, Building Information Management & Asset management 
 Mapjects AssetFENCE – management of assets both commercial, industrial & federal properties for leased and purchased sites
 Mapjects RADAR – management of real property commercial and federal properties for leased and purchased sites
 MapjectsIMPORT for Linux – freeware, also available on other platforms, lets users import files across QuickBooks, Archibus, AutoDesk CAD and Map them to assets in excel

SQL dataBases GUI admin tools
 Navicat – Linux version is based upon the Windows version using Wine.

 Remote Desktop 

 TeamViewer
 AnyDesk
 NoMachine
 Splashtop

 Emulators 

 Video game console emulators 

 Platform virtual machines 

Windows compatibility layer
 Bordeaux
 Cedega – Windows games compatibility layer; based on the free compatibility layer Wine (discontinued)
 CrossOver – based on the free compatibility layer Wine.

Notes
A. Open-source drivers are available through HP Linux Imaging and Printing 

See also
 Wine, a "compatibility layer" that allows many windows software to run on Linux (both proprietary and free)

References

 External links 
 This list is based on The Table of equivalents / replacements / analogs of Windows software in Linux, which is licensed under GNU FDL.''

Linux software
Linux proprietary software